Pavanelli is a surname. Notable people with the surname include:

 Livio Pavanelli (1881–1958), Italian film actor
 Rosa Pavanelli (born 1955), Italian trade union leader

See also
 Paganelli

Italian-language surnames